Star Collection may refer to:
Star Collection (Iron Butterfly album), 1973
Star Collection (Baccara album), 1991